Mika Pyörälä (born 13 July 1981) is a Finnish former professional ice hockey forward. He played for the Philadelphia Flyers of the National Hockey League (NHL), Timrå IK and Frölunda HC of the Swedish Elitserien, and Amur Khabarovsk of the Russian Kontinental Hockey League. Pyörälä played his entire career in Finnish Liiga in Oulun Kärpät. After 2-1 overtime loss for Ilves Tampere in the seventh game of Finnish Championship Playoffs quarterfinals at 6th April 2022 he announced the end of his professional hockey career.

Playing career

On 14 July 2009, Pyörälä signed a one-year contract with the Philadelphia Flyers. After splitting the 2009–10 season between the Flyers and the AHL's Adirondack Phantoms, Pyörälä returned to Europe, signing a three-year contract with Frölunda HC on 29 July 2010.

Pyörälä represented Finland in the 2011 World Championships. He scored a goal in the final against Sweden as Finland took the gold medal.

Career statistics

Regular season and playoffs

International

References

External links

1981 births
Adirondack Phantoms players
Amur Khabarovsk players
Finnish expatriate ice hockey players in Russia
Finnish expatriate ice hockey players in Sweden
Finnish expatriate ice hockey players in the United States
Finnish ice hockey centres
Frölunda HC players
Ice hockey players at the 2018 Winter Olympics
Living people
Luleå HF players
Olympic ice hockey players of Finland
Oulun Kärpät players
Philadelphia Flyers players
Sportspeople from Oulu
Timrå IK players
Undrafted National Hockey League players